Daniel Alexandersson (born 3 December 1978) is a Swedish former professional footballer who played as a midfielder or forward. He is the younger brother of Niclas Alexandersson.

Career
Alexandersson started his youth career at Vessigebro BK and continued his early career at Halmstads BK, where his brother and father had played. He also played for Falkenbergs FF and Danish side Viborg FF before joining IF Elfsborg in 2005.

During his tenure at IF Elsborg, he was in the starting eleven. In the 2006 Allsvenskan, he scored five goals and won the Swedish Championship gold.

In 2008, Alexandersson left Elfsborg for IFK Göteborg where he played alongside his brother Niclas who retired after the 2008 season. In early 2010 Alexandersson chose to return to Falkenbergs FF. He retired after the 2011 season.

Biography
Alexandersson was born in Falkenberg, Sweden to father Lennart Alexandersson who was a Halmstads BK player in the 1960s. He lived in Vessigebro as a child where he trained until moving to Halmstad.

Honours
IF Elfsborg:
 Allsvenskan: 2006
 Supercupen: 2007

IFK Göteborg:
 Supercupen: 2008

References

External links
  
  (archive)
 
 

Living people
1978 births
Swedish footballers
Association football forwards
Allsvenskan players
Superettan players
Falkenbergs FF players
IFK Göteborg players
IF Elfsborg players
Halmstads BK players
Viborg FF players
Swedish expatriate footballers
Swedish expatriate sportspeople in Denmark
Expatriate men's footballers in Denmark
People from Falkenberg Municipality
Sportspeople from Halland County